Squash at the 2018 Commonwealth Games was held at the Oxenford Studios on the Gold Coast, Australia from April 5 to 15. A total of five events are scheduled to be held, two each for men and women and a mixed doubles event.

Schedule

Medal table

Medallists

Participating nations
There are 28 participating nations in squash with a total of 106 athletes.

References

External links
 Results Book – Squash

 
2018
2018 in squash
2018 Commonwealth Games events
Squash tournaments in Australia